David Mejia is a Spanish-Colombian kickboxer.

Career
On September 6, 2014 Mejia faced Adrian Maxim at the Fight Dreams event in Albacete Spain. He won the fight by decision.

Titles and accomplishments
Kombat League
 2012 Kombat League K-1 Pro-Am Spain -64kg Champion
International Sport Karate Association
 2015 ISKA K-1 rules World -67kg Champion
 2015 ISKA Low Kick rules World -67kg Champion
Kickboxing Grand Prix
 2022 KGP World 63.5kg Champion

Kickboxing record 

|-  style="background:#;"
| 2023-03-25 || ||align=left| Andy Turland || Combat Fight Series 12 || London, England ||  ||  || 
|-
! style=background:white colspan=9 |
|-  style="background:#cfc;"
| 2022-11-20|| Win ||align=left| Dennis Haddad || Combat Fight Series 10 || London, England || Decision (Unanimous) || 3 || 3:00

|-  style="background:#cfc;"
| 2022-04-03|| Win||align=left| Lukas Mandinec || Kickboxing Grand Prix || London, England || KO (Flying knee) || 2 ||
|-
! style=background:white colspan=9 |
|-  style="background:#cfc;"
| 2021-06-11 || Win||align=left| Andy Turland || Combat Fight Series 6 || London, England || Decision (Unanimous) || 3 || 3:00
|-
|-  style="background:#fbb;"
| 2020-03-22||Loss ||align=left| Masaaki Noiri ||  K-1 World GP 2020: K’Festa 3 || Saitama, Japan ||Decision (Unanimous)  || 3 ||3:00
|-  style="background:#c5d2ea;"
| 2020-02-08|| Draw ||align=left| Mikel Sortino ||  K-1 SLAM || Bilbao, Spain || Decision || 3 || 3:00
|-  style="background:#fbb;"
| 2019-11-30|| Loss ||align=left| Tawanchai PK Saenchaimuaythaigym || Wu Lin Feng 2019: WLF -67kg World Cup 2019-2020 6th Group Stage || Zhengzhou, China || Ext.R Decision (Split) || 4 || 3:00
|-  style="background:#cfc;"
| 2019-09-28|| Win ||align=left| Zhang Wensheng || Wu Lin Feng 2019: WLF -67kg World Cup 2019-2020 4th Group Stage  || Zhengzhou, China || TKO (Doctor Stoppage)|| 2 || 0:30
|-  style="background:#cfc;"
| 2019-08-24|| Win ||align=left| Simón Santana ||FEA World GP Odessa   || Odessa, Ukraine ||  Decision (Unanimous) || 3 || 3:00
|-  style="background:#cfc;"
| 2019-07-27|| Win ||align=left| Li Xing || Wu Lin Feng 2019: WLF -67kg World Cup 2019-2020 2nd Group Stage  || Zhengzhou, China || Decision (Unanimous) || 3 || 3:00
|-  style="background:#cfc;"
| 2019-04-27|| Win ||align=left| Khyzer Hayat || Fight Dreams 6 || Spain || Decision || 5|| 3:00
|-  style="background:#cfc;"
| 2019-01-19|| Win ||align=left| Ji Xiang || Wu Lin Feng 2019: WLF World Cup Final   || Haikou, China || Decision || 3 || 3:00
|-  style="background:#cfc;"
| 2018-12-01|| Win ||align=left| Liu Yaning || Wu Lin Feng 2018: WLF -67kg World Cup 2018-2019 6th Round|| Zhengzhou, China || Decision|| 3 || 3:00
|-  style="background:#fbb;"
| 2018-10-06|| Loss ||align=left| Diego Freitas || Wu Lin Feng 2018: WLF -67kg World Cup 2018-2019 4th Round || Shangqiu,  China || Ext.R Decision || 4 || 3:00
|-  style="background:#cfc;"
| 2018-09-06|| Win ||align=left| Julian Arias||  Fight Dreams 5|| Spain || ||  ||
|-  bgcolor="#fbb"
| 2018-08-04|| Loss ||align=left| Hasan Toy || Wu Lin Feng 2018: WLF -67kg World Cup 2018-2019 2nd Round || Zhengzhou, China || Decision (Unanimous) || 3 || 3:00
|-  style="background:#cfc;"
| 2018-06-02|| Win ||align=left| Xie Lei  || Wu Lin Feng 2018: Yi Long VS Saiyok || Chongqing, China || Ext.R Decision|| 4 || 3:00
|-  style="background:#fbb;"
| 2018-03-10|| Loss ||align=left| Aiman Al Radhi || Fight Stadium 3, -67kg Semi Final|| France || Decision || 3 || 3:00
|-  style="background:#cfc;"
| 2018-02-03|| Win ||align=left| Razmik Ghulinyan ||  K1 SLAM|| Spain || Decision || 3 || 3:00
|-  style="background:#fbb;"
| 2017-11-12 || Loss ||align=left| Yang Zhuo || Kunlun Fight 67 -66kg World Championship, Semi Finals || Sanya, China || Decision (Unanimous) || 3 || 3:00 
|-
|-  style="background:#cfc;"
| 2017-11-12 || Win ||align=left| Sun Zhixiang || Kunlun Fight 67 -66kg World Championship, Quarter Finals || Sanya, China || KO  ||  ||
|-  style="background:#cfc;"
| 2017-09-06|| Win ||align=left| Mac Rakkong||  Fight Dreams 4|| Spain || KO (High Knee) ||  ||
|-  style="background:#cfc;"
| 2017-08-27 || Win ||align=left| Mohamed Galaoui || Kunlun Fight 65 || Qingdao, China || Decision (Unanimous) || 3 || 3:00
|-  style="background:#fbb;"
| 2017-03-25 || Loss ||align=left| Eddy Nait Slimani || ACB KB 9: Showdown in Paris || Paris, France || Decision (Unanimous) || 3 || 3:00
|-  style="background:#cfc;"
| 2016-10-16 || Win||align=left| Zakaria Tijarti || ACB KB 8: Only The Braves || Hoofddorp, Netherlands || Decision (Unanimous) || 3 || 3:00
|-  style="background:#cfc;"
| 2016-09-03|| Win ||align=left| Younes Cheriff ||  Fight Dreams 3|| Spain || ||  ||
|-  style="background:#fbb;"
| 2016-07-22 || Loss ||align=left| Ilya Sokolov || Tatneft Cup || Kazan, Russia || Ext.R Decision || 4 || 3:00
|-  bgcolor="#fbb"
| 2016-05-21|| Loss ||align=left| Lu Jianbo || Wu Lin feng  || China || Decision || 3 || 3:00
|-  style="background:#fbb;"
| 2016-01-30 || Loss ||align=left| Cedrick Peynaud || Championnat du Monde de K1 || Paris, France || Decision (Unanimous) || 5 || 3:00 
|-
! style=background:white colspan=9 |
|-  bgcolor="#fbb"
| 2015-10-10|| Loss ||align=left| Ilias Bulaid || Enfusion Live 32 || Belgium || Decision || 3 || 3:00
|-  style="background:#cfc;"
| 2015-09-06|| Win ||align=left| Carlos Correia||  Fight Dreams 2|| Spain || Decision|| 3 || 3:00
|-  style="background:#cfc;"
| 2015-07-09 || Win ||align=left| Dmitrii Grafov|| || Russia || Decision (Unanimous) || 5 || 3:00 
|-
! style=background:white colspan=9 |
|-  style="background:#cfc;"
| 2015-04-05 || Win ||align=left| Lom-Ali Eeskiev || Time Fight|| Brussels, Belgium || Decision (Unanimous) || 3 || 3:00
|-  style="background:#cfc;"
| 2015-03-21 || Win ||align=left| Kichima Yattabare|| Meaux Fight IV|| France || Decision (Unanimous) || 5 || 3:00 
|-
! style=background:white colspan=9 |
|-  style="background:#cfc;"
| 2014-12-06 || Win ||align=left| Alejandro Bonilla || Iron Kick Fight Night || Spain || Decision || 3 || 3:00
|-  style="background:#cfc;"
| 2014-09-06 || Win ||align=left| Adrian Maxim || Fight Dreams || Albacete, Spain || Decision (split) || 3 || 3:00
|-  style="background:#cfc;"
| 2014-04 || Win ||align=left| Mathieu Bernard ||  || Belgium || Decision || 3 || 3:00
|-  style="background:#cfc;"
| 2013-10-12 || Win ||align=left| Avelino Molina || MAD FIGHT || Spain || Decision (Unanimous) || 3 || 3:00
|-  style="background:#cfc;"
| 2013- || Win ||align=left| Adam Martin Asalto ||  || Spain || Decision (Unanimous) || 3 || 3:00
|-  style="background:#cfc;"
| 2013-04-13 || Win ||align=left| Gabi Ginu || || Spain || Decision (Unanimous) || 3 || 3:00
|-  style="background:#cfc;"
| 2012-11-17 || Win ||align=left| Abdo Tabaki || Heroes IV || Spain || Decision  || 3 || 2:00
|-  style="background:#cfc;"
| 2012-09-01 || Win ||align=left| Jesus Cabello || Kombat League || Spain || TKO  || 4 ||  
|-
! style=background:white colspan=9 |  
|-
| colspan=9 | Legend:

See also 
List of male kickboxers

References

1995 births
Living people
Spanish male kickboxers
Sportspeople from Medellín